The 2017–18 US SuperTour was a season of the US SuperTour, a Continental Cup season in cross-country skiing for men and women. The season began on 2 December 2017 in West Yellowstone, Montana and concluded with on 28 March 2018 in Craftsbury, Vermont.

Calendar

Men

Women

Overall standings

Men's overall standings

Women's overall standings

References

External links 
Men's Overall standings (FIS)
Women's Overall standings (FIS)

US SuperTour
US SuperTour seasons
2017 in cross-country skiing
2018 in cross-country skiing